Some Kind of Creativity is the first studio album by the Israeli psychedelic trance couple LOUD, this album is the direct result of the team's year long musical expedition, bringing in magical new sounds, defining a new approach to Trance oriented music. Containing tracks like 'Subinya', '1 Missed Call' and 'Sun Dance', This is certainly one of those one of a kind releases, which will influence the whole scene. Some Kind Of Creativity, just screams out Loud: 'Creativity' and 'Total Musical Expression', and is highly intelligent and unique, bearing new experimental flavors, fussed by a vast selection of musical styles. This outstanding phenomenon includes 10 previously unreleased tracks, perfectly aligned, each track complements the other, yet totally different, each bearing its own distinct personality, drive and story, all elevating and fully entertaining...Loud have certainly put in a lot of energy in the production of this one of a kind product, which stands out with reach colors.

Track listing

References

Loud (electronic music act) albums
2006 debut albums